The Rabaul Strike of 25 January 1929 was the first ever industrial strike in Papua New Guinea. It was led by Sumsuma.

References 

1920s in Papua New Guinea
January 1929 events
1929 labor disputes and strikes